Holocalyx balansae is a species of flowering plant in the legume family, Fabaceae. It belongs to the subfamily Faboideae. It is the only member of the genus Holocalyx.

References

Exostyleae
Monotypic Fabaceae genera